Patrícia Emidio Rodrigues (born 6 November 1997) is a Portuguese handballer who plays for S.L. Benfica and the Portugal national team.

References

   
1997 births
Living people     
Sportspeople from Coimbra
Portuguese female handball players 
Expatriate handball players 
Portuguese expatriate sportspeople in Germany